Vincent Saurin (17 April 1907 – 13 December 1991) was a French rower who specialised in single sculls. In this event he won nine national titles and three medals at the European championships of 1931–1934. He competed at the 1928 Summer Olympics, but failed to reach the final. Later he changed to coxless fours and won medals at French championships in 1939 and 1943. Between 1952 and 1988 he served as president of Société Nautique De Lagny Aviron.

References

1907 births
1991 deaths
French male rowers
Olympic rowers of France
Rowers at the 1928 Summer Olympics
European Rowing Championships medalists
20th-century French people